The 2005–06 QMJHL season was the 37th season in the history of the Quebec Major Junior Hockey League. The Canadian Hockey League institutes the shootout loss statistic to be recorded in the regular season standings. The league inaugurates the Maurice Filion Trophy for the "General Manager of the Year."

The QMJHL continued to expand eastward, into former American Hockey League markets, by granting franchises in Saint John, New Brunswick and St. John's, Newfoundland and Labrador. The league reorganizes into a West Division, entirely made of teams from the province of Quebec, and an East Division, entirely made of teams in Atlantic Canada. Eighteen teams played 70 games each in the schedule.

Coach Ted Nolan led the Moncton Wildcats to a first overall finish in the regular season, winning their first Jean Rougeau Trophy. The Wildcats also won their first President's Cup, defeating the Quebec Remparts in the finals. Since Moncton was chosen by default (due to no other bids) to host the 2006 Memorial Cup tournament, the Remparts qualified for the Cup as league finalists, and won the Memorial Cup, defeating Moncton in the championship game.

Team changes
 The Saint John Sea Dogs join the league as an expansion franchise.
 The St. John's Fog Devils join the league as an expansion franchise.

Final standings
Note: GP = Games played; W = Wins; L = Losses; OTL = Overtime loss; SL = Shootout loss; PTS = Points; GF = Goals for; GA = Goals against

y- division champion
x- playoff team
complete list of standings.

Scoring leaders
Note: GP = Games played; G = Goals; A = Assists; Pts = Points; PIM = Penalty minutes

 complete scoring statistics

Canada-Russia Challenge
The 2005 ADT Canada-Russia Challenge was hosted by the Drummondville Voltigeurs and the Moncton Wildcats. On November 21, 2005, the QMJHL All-stars defeated the Russian Selects 7–4 at the Centre Marcel Dionne. On November 22, 2005, the QMJHL All-stars defeated the Russian Selects 6–4 at the Moncton Coliseum. Since the tournament began in 2003, the QMJHL All-stars and Russian Selects have three wins each.

Playoffs
The top nine teams from the West division, and top seven teams from the Eastern division qualified for the playoffs. The ninth place team in the West division qualified in the Eastern division, and ranked by regular season points. All series were best-of-seven. Divisions crossed over in the semifinals.

Alexander Radulov was the leading scorer of the playoffs with 55 points (21 goals, 34 assists).

†Victoriaville seeded 8th in Eastern division.

All-star teams
First team  
 Goaltender - Ondrej Pavelec, Cape Breton Screaming Eagles
 Left defence - Kris Letang, Val-d'Or Foreurs 
 Right defence - Keith Yandle, Moncton Wildcats
 Left winger - Maxime Boisclair, Chicoutimi Saguenéens
 Centreman - Derick Brassard, Drummondville Voltigeurs
 Right winger - Alexander Radulov, Quebec Remparts

Second team 
 Goaltender - Josh Tordjman, Victoriaville Tigres / Moncton Wildcats
 Left defence - Frédéric St-Denis, Drummondville Voltigeurs
 Right defence - Michal Sersen, Quebec Remparts
 Left winger - Alex Bourret, Shawinigan Cataractes
 Centreman - David Desharnais, Chicoutimi Saguenéens
 Right winger - Stanislav Lascek, Chicoutimi Saguenéens

Rookie team 
 Goaltender - Ondrej Pavelec, Cape Breton Screaming Eagles
 Left defence - Ivan Vishnevskiy, Rouyn-Noranda Huskies
 Right defence - Andrew Bodnarchuk, Halifax Mooseheads
 Left winger - Felix Schutz, Saint John Sea Dogs 
 Centreman - Angelo Esposito, Quebec Remparts 
 Right winger - Claude Giroux, Gatineau Olympiques
 List of First/Second/Rookie team all-stars.

Trophies and awards
Team
President's Cup - Playoff Champions, Moncton Wildcats
Jean Rougeau Trophy - Regular Season Champions, Moncton Wildcats
Luc Robitaille Trophy - Team that scored the most goals, Quebec Remparts
Robert Lebel Trophy - Team with best GAA, Moncton Wildcats

Player
Michel Brière Memorial Trophy - Most Valuable Player, Alexander Radulov, Quebec Remparts
Jean Béliveau Trophy - Top Scorer, Alexander Radulov, Quebec Remparts
Guy Lafleur Trophy - Playoff MVP, Martins Karsums, Moncton Wildcats    
Telus Cup – Offensive - Offensive Player of the Year, Alexander Radulov, Quebec Remparts
Telus Cup – Defensive - Defensive Player of the Year, Keith Yandle, Moncton Wildcats
Jacques Plante Memorial Trophy - Best GAA, Ondrej Pavelec, Cape Breton Screaming Eagles
Guy Carbonneau Trophy - Best Defensive Forward, David Brine, Halifax Mooseheads
Emile Bouchard Trophy - Defenceman of the Year, Keith Yandle, Moncton Wildcats
Kevin Lowe Trophy - Best Defensive Defenceman, Olivier Magnan, Rouyn-Noranda Huskies   
Mike Bossy Trophy - Best Pro Prospect, Derick Brassard, Drummondville Voltigeurs
RDS Cup - Rookie of the Year, Ondrej Pavelec, Cape Breton Screaming Eagles 
Michel Bergeron Trophy - Offensive Rookie of the Year, Angelo Esposito, Quebec Remparts
Raymond Lagacé Trophy - Defensive Rookie of the Year, Ondrej Pavelec, Cape Breton Screaming Eagles
Frank J. Selke Memorial Trophy - Most sportsmanlike player, David Desharnais, Chicoutimi Saguenéens
QMJHL Humanitarian of the Year - Humanitarian of the Year, Joey Ryan, Quebec Remparts
Marcel Robert Trophy - Best Scholastic Player, Pierre-Marc Guilbault, Shawinigan Cataractes

Executive
Ron Lapointe Trophy - Coach of the Year, André Tourigny, Rouyn-Noranda Huskies 
Maurice Filion Trophy - General Manager of the Year, Ted Nolan, Moncton Wildcats
John Horman Trophy - Executive of the Year, Eric Verrier, Drummondville Voltigeurs 
Jean Sawyer Trophy - Marketing Director of the Year, André Gosselin and Stéphane Rhéaume, Drummondville Voltigeurs
Paul Dumont Trophy - Personality of the Year, Clément Jodoin, Lewiston Maineiacs

See also
2006 Memorial Cup
2006 NHL Entry Draft
2005–06 OHL season
2005–06 WHL season

References
 Official QMJHL Website
 www.hockeydb.com/

Quebec Major Junior Hockey League seasons
QMJHL